Blair Tefkin is an American actress, singer and songwriter.

Life and career
Blair Tefkin was born in Los Angeles, California. She is best known for her role as Robin Maxwell on the 1983 science fiction miniseries V (replacing Dominique Dunne, who was murdered in pre-production), the 1984 sequel V: The Final Battle, and V: The Series. Other notable television roles include Chris Elliott's love interest, Charlene, on Get a Life.  Blair co-starred with Martin Mull on the CBS sitcom, His & Hers and with Rupert Everett as humorless French filmmakers in the obscure Saturday Night Live.
 
Film roles include Pat Bernardo in Fast Times at Ridgemont High (credited as Blair Ashleigh), Three for the Road with Charlie Sheen, A Sinful Life, Inside Monkey Zetterland, Fright Night Part 2, S.F.W., and Dream Lover with James Spader. In The Anniversary Party with Jennifer Jason Leigh and Alan Cumming, Tefkin also performs an original song, "If Your Love Is True". Her song, "Troubles" appears on the movie's soundtrack as well.  In 2010 she played opposite Ben Stiller in Noah Baumbach's Greenberg.

Blair was a member of The Sunday Company at L.A.’s renowned improv theatre, The Groundlings where she also starred in the hit play Just Like The Pom Pom Girls for which she won both L.A. Weekly and Dramalogue awards.

As a songwriter, Tefkin was signed to a publishing and development deal with PolyGram Publishing in 1996 and formed the indie band Lucie Gamelon, in which she sang and played bass. Lucie Gamelon was a fixture on the L.A. music scene and played major dates on the 1998 Lilith Fair tour sharing the stage with Patty Griffin and Morcheeba among others.  Lucie Gamelon released a six-song EP: Everything Is Nice, In 2001, Tefkin released her solo CD Shocked and Devastated.

In 2004, Tefkin performed her one-woman show In the Land of the Giants: A Tragicomedy With Music at the Blank Theatre in Hollywood which the L.A. Times described as "witty, poignant and often hilarious."

During the 2020 pandemic, Tefkin posted a new song, “What’s The Point of It All” on YouTube and @Blairtefkinmusic. A new EP, I Like It When You're Down is slated for a 2021 release.

External links

Living people
20th-century American actresses
21st-century American actresses
20th-century American singers
21st-century American singers
American film actresses
American television actresses
American women singer-songwriters
American singer-songwriters
Actresses from Los Angeles
20th-century American women singers
21st-century American women singers
Year of birth missing (living people)